Turner Washington (born February 10, 1999) is an American shot put and discus thrower.

Washington competes for Arizona State University in both discus and shot put, becoming the 2021 NCAA Indoor and Outdoor champion in the latter.

Personal life
His father Anthony competed in three consecutive Summer Olympics, and the 1999 World Championships in Seville, where he won the gold medal in the discus.

References

External links
 
  (Track & Field Results Reporting System)
 Turner Washington at Arizona State Sun Devils

1999 births
Living people
American male discus throwers
American male shot putters
Arizona State Sun Devils men's track and field athletes
Sportspeople from Tucson, Arizona
Track and field athletes from Arizona
Arizona Wildcats men's track and field athletes